Daniel Meade is a fictional character in the American romantic drama-comedy series Ugly Betty. He is portrayed by Eric Mabius.

Background
Daniel (born in 1974) is the second child of magazine publisher Bradford Meade and Claire Meade. After his graduation from Harvard, Daniel's father picked him to succeed the well-respected (and recently deceased) Fey Sommers as editor-in-chief at MODE, the fashion magazine Bradford publishes and Claire owns.

Aware of his son's inexperience in the fashion industry, Bradford hired a personal assistant to help and guide Daniel. Daniel was renowned as a womanizer, so Bradford chose to hire for the role a fashion-ignorant but bright Betty Suarez, who he believed Daniel would never be attracted to. An integral part of the show's premise is that Betty is considered ugly by the denizens of the New York fashion world of MODE and specifically by Daniel himself.

Daniel's initial repulsion and resentment of Betty, over the course of the show's 4 seasons, turns first into respect and ultimately into a close friendship further leading to the possibility of a more romantic relationship. As Betty's character undergoes a metamorphosis into a polished professional woman, Daniel's perception of Betty's beauty alters as an outward sign of his growing maturity, evolving into a more mature person.

Daniel's late brother Alex was the editor-in-chief of another Meade publication, Hudson. Part of Daniel's motivation as a character is proving that he could hold his own without living in Alex's shadow. However, he is unaware that Alex is not only alive and had a sex change, but Alex (now Alexis) is plotting to have Daniel removed from the job. When Alexis attempts to fire Daniel, he fires back with an injunction because "Alex" was legally dead and therefore no longer had any ownership of the company. The ensuing sibling rivalry is negotiated by Betty playing mediator between the two. Daniel and Alexis are ultimately forced by their mother to share co-Editor in Chief duties until Alexis' departure from the show.

Daniel's womanizing is overt and unabashed. Towards the end of the first season, a model he'd slept with attempts to extort him by saying she was only 16 as part of a plan by Alexis to force Daniel's ouster from Mode. Betty saves Daniel by finding evidence that the model was actually 20, but Betty insists Daniel deal with his sexual addiction immediately before it destroys him. Seeking the help of a psychologist, Daniel begins taking a prescription to help him control his sex addiction. The first season ends with Daniel accidentally overdosing, and Alexis attempting to get Daniel to the hospital.  On the way, the car crashes because the assassin Alexis had hired to kill Bradford Meade had cut the brakes.

In the premiere of season 2, Daniel recovers from the car wreck and uses a wheelchair, while his sister is still in a coma three weeks later. After, he helps Betty "bury" Henry, and at the last minute throws his pills into the hole, saying he will get over his addictions. Alexis wakes up from her coma and, when Daniel asks her Are you all right, Alexis? she replies, "why are you calling me Alexis? It's Alex! " Alexis has forgotten about her recent sex change. Daniel tries to cover for her by saying it was his fault, but when Alexis regains her memory and admits the attempted murder to him, Daniel agrees not to say anything to their father.

Daniel's rocky relationship with his family worsens when he learns Bradford, who blames Daniel for losing key advertisers, has started repairing his bond with Alexis. Daniel also opposes his father's marriage to Wilhelmina. When he discovers her bodyguard coming out of her apartment he puts two and two together, only to learn from Betty she knew about their affair four months earlier because she made a deal with Wilhelmina not to say anything in order to get Betty's father Ignacio back to the United States. Daniel fires her for betraying her trust, but as he was trying to tell his father about Wilhelmina's affair, Bradford has a heart attack at the wedding, dying several days later. After Ignacio explains why Betty had kept Wilhelmina's secret, Daniel regrets his decision and tries to talk Betty into coming back.

After Bradford's passing, Daniel and Alexis battle to succeed him as chairman/CEO of Meade Publishing, culminating in a paintball contest. Daniel loses to Alexis, who pretended to be hurt while they were playing.

Daniel briefly dates Wilhelmina's sister, Renee.  That relationship comes to an end when she tries to kill Betty out of jealousy and was put into an asylum.

Wilhelmina returns to Mode after she reveals her unborn child with Daniel's dead father. This makes her an even bigger enemy than before, as she demotes Daniel from editor-in-chief, and again becomes Alexis' ally. Daniel is reassigned to editor-in-chief of Player magazine, a magazine directed toward men, but, thanks to Betty discovering letters of loyalty given to her on purpose by Marc, as well as good ideas in Daniel's mock-up of Mode, Daniel is reinstated as Mode's editor-in-chief after sales plunged under Wilhelmina's rein.

Daniel also seems to be the father of a little French boy, named Daniel Jr (affectionately known as DJ). He met the boy's mother, a French model, on a trip to Paris years ago. (Alexis was also present on the trip.) In a letter to Daniel Jr. from his mother, she tells him that Daniel is his father. However, results from a paternity test show Alexis Meade is the actual father. When the parents of Daniel Jr.'s mother want to take him back to France, Daniel tries to take him away but realized he can't do that and instead decides it is better to be "the cool uncle."

When Wilhelmina suggests hiring Connor Owens to be the new financial officer for Meade, Daniel is reluctant as he seems to hate the man. Eventually, Wilhelmina gets her way only for it to turn out Daniel and Connor were playing at disliking each other to trick her. However, Connor doesn't play favorites with Daniel either, doing whatever he feels best for the company. At a company retreat, Daniel meets Connor's fiancée Molly and the two strike an instant flirtation. This gets the attention of Wilhelmina who, wanting Connor for herself, seems to be planning to push the two together.  After they share an almost kiss Daniel decides to confess his feelings.  In the beginning, she leaves the party upset but afterwards, she joins him and after telling him that she has just broken up with Connor, they kiss.  Their relationship seems to be good until she tells him that she has cancer.

Towards the end of season 3, he marries Molly. However, she collapses on their wedding night, and after begins developing fevers, indicating her time was coming to an end. At Molly's insistence, Daniel goes to accept an award on behalf of Meade, and he sees Molly through the crowd before quickly disappearing. He realizes she has died while he was giving his acceptance speech, and he comes back to his apartment just in time to see her body being carried out in a body bag. He calls Betty to help console him on the stoop of his apartment.

As the series enters its fourth season, Daniel tries to control his feeling over the loss of Molly by throwing objects and punching out people. Betty would later intervene and he seeks help at a bereavement group, where he meets a woman named Natalie. But the relationship starts to get a lot stranger when Natalie invites Daniel to join the Community of the Phoenix, a cult-like group led by Bennett Wallace, resulting in Natalie manipulating Daniel into turning on Betty, Claire and Amanda because they're seen as bad influences.

This prompts Betty and Claire to take action to save Daniel after the group take over the Mode offices, and gets the break they needed when Matt warns them about "Level 7" where they help people contact the dead, but it has already resulted in a death of a previous member after they drank a tea that was actually a drug. Although Betty and Claire save Daniel, his attempts to talk Natalie out of it failed.

With that drama out of the way, Daniel turns his attention to getting Cal Hartley, now that he knows about his affair with Claire and making risky decisions behind his back, out the way by forming an unlikely partnership with Wilhelmina to retrieve the money Connor stole, but only on the condition that Claire never finds out.

Also, Daniel accidentally walks into Claire and Cal kissing and he believes that the two had an affair when Bradford was still alive. Giving the cold shoulder towards the couple, Claire decides to find her long-lost son named Tyler and when the latter was chosen to be featured in Fashion Week 2010, a sibling rivalry begins when Daniel was "upstaged" by Tyler.

Daniel discovers the biological truth when he sees pictures of Claire and Tyler dining together and when he confronts Tyler to leave Claire alone; Claire finally spills the beans. Shocked, Daniel begins to avoid talking or even having eye-contact with Tyler and Claire. Realizing that nothing would change, Daniel begins to warm up to Tyler by inviting him to clubs and parties in the city.

In the series finale, he resigns from Mode, thus making Wilhelmina sole editor-in-chief, to follow Betty to London, where they both start over professionally (following their "dreams"). Additionally, it is implied in Daniel's final "Letter from the Editor" that he also chose to follow Betty to London to pursue a romantic relationship with her.

Residency
Daniel Meade's letters and magazines are sent to his address at 6767 West End Ave., New York, but it is not specific whether this is his apartment or his workplace.

Connections
Betty Suarez – Former assistant to Daniel, but now a Features Editor; Her knowledge has helped Daniel succeed in their jobs at MODE. The two also seem to trust each other and depend on each other a lot making them very close friends as well as coworkers. He respects her a lot and also tries to be in her good books. In the series finale, Daniel becomes aware that he is in love with Betty as he struggles to let her leave to London. In the end he asks her to have dinner with him.
Fey Sommers – Former editor-In-chief; Her death resulted in Daniel being named the successor, a move stopping Wilhelmina from getting that job. He is also drawn into the mystery surrounding Sommers via a series of phone calls (made by Alexis, his brother/sister) warning him to "watch his back" when he is around his father.
Wilhelmina Slater – Co-editor-in-chief at MODE; Daniel's role as the editor-in-chief has made Betty and him unlikely enemies of the Creative Director. She wants Daniel's job and is determined to make sure, by any means necessary, Daniel and Betty never succeed in the world of fashion.  She succeeded in taking everything away from Daniel, including his position as editor-in-chief.
Bradford Meade – Daniel's late father and owner of Meade Publications; Despite handing the job to Daniel, Bradford was not sure his son could live up to the challenge. Daniel gained his trust, even though the two had shown signs of a rift in their relationship. The rift was fueled by Wilhelmina and Alexis, but would make peace prior to his passing.
Claire Meade – Daniel's mother; Has been in and out of rehab due to her drinking problem. She has warned Daniel against his womanizing and told him he will end up going the same route as his father when he had the affair with Fey. She later openly admitted to Betty, Daniel, and Bradford, and later turned herself into the police for the murder of Fey Sommers, but was later acquitted. Both have since restored their mother–son bond.
Alexis Meade – Daniel's sister, with whom he has constant sibling rivalry
Sofia Reyes – Author and editor-In-chief of sister publication MYW; Daniel fell head over heels for Sofia, who was brought in by Bradford to launch a new magazine. At first she resisted his advances because of his womanizing ways but gave in afterwards, even though she had a boyfriend who just asked her to marry him. Her presence helped curb his womanizing. Daniel asked Sofia to marry him and she accepted. However, on a national TV broadcast, Sofia revealed it had all been a plan for an article on how any woman could get any man to propose to her in only 60 days and she did not love Daniel at all, devastating him.
Amanda Tanen – Receptionist at MODE; She had an unusual romantic relationship with Daniel, and wanted the assistant editor job Betty filled. However, Daniel only thought of Amanda as a one-night stand, and this, together with his constant womanizing has strained the relationship. In the end, she gave up on Daniel but agreed to a working relationship instead. She also gave up on being Daniel's assistant after realizing Daniel trusted Betty more, and she was overqualified for the job, and demanded a raise. But it would be at the expense of her job with MODE and future to go after Daniel; when forced by Marc to sabotage a date for Daniel, she does just that. During the season 1 finale, Amanda discovers a birth certificate declaring Fey Sommers as her mother when she was accidentally trapped in Fey's love Dungeon with Christina McKinney. In the second season, Amanda believes, because of Fey's affair, Bradford may be her biological father and sets out to get a sample of his DNA to see if he really is. To the relief of Daniel and Amanda, the test results came back negative ruling out Bradford as Amanda's father. In season 4 they become lovers (or fun buddies as Amanda calls their relationship) again, and Amanda becomes Daniel's new assistant after Marc got a promotion from Wilhelmina as her new Junior Fashion Editor.
Justin Suarez – Betty's nephew; He is a fan.
 "Daniel Meade, Jr." – Daniel's nephew. He is the son of a hand model with whom Daniel had a fling years previously. With her recent death, the boy came to America to find Daniel. Initially Daniel rejected him out of hand but has since come to believe his story may be true; however, a DNA test revealed Alexis Meade is his biological father. In Betty Suarez Land, DJ discovers Daniel is in fact his uncle, and goes back to France with his grandparents as Daniel thought it would be the best.
Renee Slater – Daniel and Renee dated for a while. She tried to burn down his apartment and kill Betty because she had a mental condition, she thought that Betty was interested in Daniel. She was committed to a mental institution without hurting anyone.
Molly –  Daniel's wife and Connor's former fiancée. They became a couple after she broke with Connor, but she has terminal cancer, which causes a rift in their relationship. Although they eventually married, their union was short-lived. Weeks after their wedding, Molly died from complications with the cancer.
William McKinney – Former half-brother until found out that the baby is really Christina McKinney's

References

Betty La Fea reference
While his character is portrayed as a good guy with minor flaws, his first name is the same as the main villain's in Yo soy Betty, la fea played by Luis Mesa. However, Daniel's character is actually equivalent to Armando Mendoza Sáenz, boss of Beatriz Pinzón Solano (character on whom Betty Suarez was based).

Ugly Betty characters
Fictional characters from New York City
Fictional magazine editors
Fictional socialites
Television characters introduced in 2006
Fictional Harvard University people